Cinzia Leone (born 4 March 1959) is an Italian actress and comedian.

Life and career 
Born in Rome, Leone began working in the theater since 1981, but became popular thanks to the participation to several variety shows of good success broadcast by Raitre (La TV delle ragazze, Scusate l’interruzione, Avanzi, Tunnel).  She is also active in films, mainly used for short but often effective character roles.

In 1991 Leone suffered a congenital aneurysm of the basilar artery, undergoing a complicated surgery in Phoenix, Arizona which had a mortality rate of 80%. She was paralyzed on the left side of the body but was able to recover completely. She eventually went back to work after a long absence.

Selected filmography 
 Le finte bionde (1989)
 Stasera a casa di Alice (1990)
 Donne con le gonne (1991)
 Parenti serpenti (1992)
 Selvaggi (1995)
 The Blue Collar Worker and the Hairdresser in a Whirl of Sex and Politics (1996)
 Nero bifamiliare (2007)
 Nemici per la pelle (2006)
 Sympathy for the Lobster (2007)

References

External links 
 
 

Italian film actresses
Italian television actresses
1959 births
Actresses from Rome
Living people
Italian television personalities
Italian stage actresses